The Krasnodar City Police (Краснодарская полиция; or officially Управление МВД России по городу Краснодару = The MVD's Directorate of Krasnodar City), established on May 6, 1801, is the main municipal police force in Krasnodar Krai with primary responsibilities in law enforcement and investigation in Krasnodar City. The police is one of the oldest police departments established in Russia.

The police has a broad array of specialized services including the Emergency Services Unit (along with a local branch of Emercom), air support, bomb disposal, anti-terrorism, criminal intelligence, anti-gang, narcotics (in cooperation with FSKN), public transportation, and public housing.

Main headquarters is located in Krasnaya 23 Street in Krasnodar.

History
The police force in Kuban and Yekaterinodar City was established on May 6, 1801. In 1867, Yekaterinodar became a city, and the police force became a municipal police force (городское полицейское управление) under the command of Ivan Petin.

In March 1917, the police force was renamed Militsiya, under the supervision of Nikolai Simanovich. In March 1918, the municipal city was merged into the Krasnodar Krai Police. During the Russian civil war, the city was headed by several different groups including the White monarchists and finally the Red Army.

In 1920, while R. Shipulin was the Chief of Police, the municipal police was divided into five municipal departments. During the pre-World War II years, the city suffered from a high level of crime; and in 1936, the police was divided into three regional police departments.

Chief of Police
In 1980, V. N. Khudyakov was appointed as police chief. In 1991, he was replaced by T. G. Dzhidzhikhia.

During the 1990s, N. V. Goncharov was the head of the police force in Krasnodar; in 2003, he was appointed as Head of Police in Belgorod Oblast and A.I. Semeyonov was appointed as Chief of Police to take his place.

In June 2011, Oleg Agarkov was appointed as the Chief of Police.

External links
Official Website

Krasnodar
Government agencies established in 1801
Law enforcement agencies of Russia